The twenty-eighth series of the British reality television programme The Only Way Is Essex began airing on 12 September 2021, and concluded on 14 November following 10 episodes. A further two "Essexmas" special episodes aired on 15 and 16 December. Ahead of the series it was announced that the show would be evolving with some changes, including axing a number of cast members to therefore focus on a smaller group of cast and allow more time to film their real lives such as their bonds between family and friends. Cast members confirmed not to be returning for this series were Chloe Meadows, Clelia Theodorou, Courtney Green, Ella Wise, Harry Derbidge, Harry Lee, Kelsey Stratford, Nicole Bass, Rem Larue and Tom McDonnell, joining Georgia Kousoulou, Tommy Mallett and Joey Turner, who had already previously announced they'd quit. Bobby Cole Norris also announced that he had quit the series but would be presenting "TOWIE: The Official After Party", a new online spin-off series.

Yaz Oukhellou also made her return to the series during the premiere. Despite having been axed from the show, Chloe Meadows, Courtney Green, Ella Wise, Harry Derbidge made brief guest appearances throughout the series alongside Frankie Essex, Georgia Kousoulou, Tommy Mallet and Nikki Blackwell who also made small returns. The series included appearances from two former Love Island stars Joe Garett and Jack Fincham, and new cast members Angel Bo-Stanley and Bill Delbosq also made their debut.

Cast

Episodes

{| class="wikitable plainrowheaders" style="width:100%; background:#fff;"
! style="background:#FFD97A;"| Seriesno.
! style="background:#FFD97A;"| Episodeno.
! style="background:#FFD97A;"| Title
! style="background:#FFD97A;"| Original air date
! style="background:#FFD97A;"| Duration
! style="background:#FFD97A;"| UK viewers

|}

Ratings
Catch-up service totals were added to the official ratings.

References

The Only Way Is Essex
2021 British television seasons
Media depictions of the COVID-19 pandemic in the United Kingdom